6 km dorogi Kem-Kalevala is a rural locality (a settlement) in Kemskoye Urban Settlement of Kemsky District, Russia. The  population was 4 as of 2013.

Geography 
The settlement is located 6 km west of Kem (the district's administrative centre) by road. Kem is the nearest rural locality.

Streets 
There are no streets with titles.

References 

Rural localities in the Republic of Karelia
Kemsky District